The Frog Level Historic District is a national historic district located in the Frog Level neighborhood at Waynesville, Haywood County, North Carolina.  It includes 16 contributing buildings and one other contributing structure in the neighborhood of Frog Level.   It includes Early Commercial architecture and Romanesque architecture.  The buildings are predominantly one and two-story brick or frame buildings dating from the first three decades of the 20th century. Notable buildings include the C. G. Logan Auto Company (c. 1915), the Medford Furniture Company (1912), the T. N. Massie & Son building (c. 1900), and the North Carolina National Guard Armory (1936).

It was listed on the National Register of Historic Places in 2003.

References

Commercial buildings on the National Register of Historic Places in North Carolina
Historic districts on the National Register of Historic Places in North Carolina
Buildings designated early commercial in the National Register of Historic Places
Romanesque Revival architecture in North Carolina
Geography of Haywood County, North Carolina
National Register of Historic Places in Haywood County, North Carolina
Waynesville, North Carolina